The Kibwezi–Kitui–Kandwia–Usueni Road, also B7 Road (Kenya) is a road in Kenya, the largest economy in the East African Community. The road connects the town of Kibwezi in Makueni County to the community of Usueni in Kitui County. Since its upgrading, the road has opened up many villages and rural-urban settings to business and agricultural activities.

Location
The coordinates of this road in the town of Kitui are  01°22'23.0"S, 38°00'42.0"E (Latitude:-1.373056; Longitude:38.011667).

Overview
This road connects the relatively remote parts of the counties of Kitui, Machakos, and Makueni to the Nairobi–Mombasa Road (A109) and the Thika–Liboi (A3) road, both major highways. These links increase access to both Nairobi and Mombasa for these remote communities.

Upgrading to tarmac
The road, being a Class B road, is under the supervision and management of the Kenya National Highways Authority. It is being upgraded to Class II bitumen surface, with shoulders, culverts, and drainage channels. The construction contract was awarded to  Sinohydro Corporation of China, with joint funding from the China Export Import Bank and the government of Kenya. Construction began on 6 December 2016, with completion expected in December 2019.

Towns  
The following seventeen towns, listed from south towards north, are located along this road: 1. Kibwezi 2. Athi River 3. Ikutha 4. Mutomo 5. Ikanga 6. Mwewe 7. Kitui 8. Katheka 9. Kwa Siku 10. Migwani 11. Thokoa 12. Musuani 13. Mbondoni 14. Mwingi 15. Waita 16. Kamuwongo 17. Katse 18. Usueni. The new road has been attributed to land appreciation, particularly in Kitui and Mutomo town which are now becoming business hubs for outsiders targeting the route for its connection to Mombasa. Currently, an estimated 5000sqm of land plots along the Kitui-Kibwezi roads are fetching approximately kes. 450,000 post-road construction. Five years ago, land prices in Mutomo ranged between kes 70,000 - 95,000.

References

External links
Website of Kenya National Highways Authority

Roads in Kenya
Geography of Kenya
Transport in Kenya
Makueni County
Machakos County
Kitui County